Phyllonorycter grewiaephilos is a moth of the family Gracillariidae. It is found in the Rift Valley and Tsavo National Park in Kenya. The habitat consists of savannah areas at altitudes between 470 and 920 meters.

The length of the forewings is 2.7–2.9 mm. The forewings are elongate and the ground colour is ochreous brown with white markings. The hindwings are dirty white with a slight golden shine. Adults are on wing from early February to mid-April.

The larvae feed as leaf miners on Grewia villosa.  The mine has the form of a tentiform mine, which is either elongate or oval. It is made on the underside of the leaf. The mine is 11–16 mm long and opaque creamy or light brown in colour. The frass is loosely scattered. Pupation takes place without cocoon.

Etymology
The specific name is composed of the host plant genus Grewia and the Greek name philos (meaning friend).

References

Endemic moths of Kenya
Moths described in 2012
grewiaephilos
Moths of Africa

Taxa named by Jurate de Prins
Leaf miners